Gigides is a genus of moths of the family Erebidae. The genus was erected by George Hampson in 1926.

Species
Gigides distorta (Dognin, 1914) Colombia
Gigides ferreolepra Hampson, 1926 Peru
Gigides megalops Hampson, 1926 Peru

References

Calpinae